San Rocco is a Roman Catholic church, located in Piacenza, Italy. It is dedicated to Saint Roch, patron of those afflicted by the Plague.

Commissioned by the Confraternity of San Rocco, while externally plain, the interior of the church was decorated in a rich late-Baroque or Rococo style. The church houses a canvas of Madonna and Saints by Giuseppe Nuvolone, a canvas of the Life of San Rocco by Giuseppe Gorla (1722) and a Glory of San Rocco by Paolo Bozzini.

References

Roman Catholic churches in Piacenza
Baroque architecture in Piacenza